The 2023 Stuttgart Surge season is the second season of Stuttgart Surge in the European League of Football. It is the first season with a new head coach after a winless season prior.

Preseason
To the end of the regular season in 2022, the team and coaching staff of the franchise were in turmoil after finishing the first two seasons with 2 - 20. The front office in contrast were kept stabile with two additions to it of former coaches of the organization.
Following changes in staff and personnel concerned transactions from the German League Champion Schwäbisch Hall Unicorns to the franchise. Almost the complete staff around Jordan Neumann changed the league, following the demise of the German Football League and its problematic structures. Connected to that, a lot of players were following in hopes of better competition and exposure.

Regular season

Standings

Roster

Transactions
From Frankfurt Galaxy: Konstantin Katz, Kai Hunter 
From Cologne Centurions: Louis Geyer 
From Leipzig Kings: Philip Eichhorn

Staff

Notes

References 

Stuttgart Surge season
Stuttgart Surge
Stuttgart Surge